The first election to Mid and East Antrim District Council, part of the Northern Ireland local elections on 22 May 2014, returned 40 members to the newly formed council via Single Transferable Vote. The Democratic Unionist Party were the largest party in both first-preference votes and seats.

Election results

Districts summary

|- class="unsortable" align="centre"
!rowspan=2 align="left"|Ward
! % 
!Cllrs
! %
!Cllrs
! %
!Cllrs
! %
!Cllrs
! %
!Cllrs
! %
!Cllrs
! %
!Cllrs
! %
!Cllrs
!rowspan=2|TotalCllrs
|- class="unsortable" align="center"
!colspan=2 bgcolor="" | DUP
!colspan=2 bgcolor="" | UUP
!colspan=2 bgcolor="" | TUV
!colspan=2 bgcolor="" | Alliance
!colspan=2 bgcolor=""| Sinn Féin
!colspan=2 bgcolor=""| SDLP
!colspan=2 bgcolor="" | UKIP
!colspan=2 bgcolor="white"| Others
|-
|align="left"|Ballymena
|bgcolor="#D46A4C"|29.5
|bgcolor="#D46A4C"|3
|5.8
|1
|17.0
|1
|4.7
|0
|7.3
|0
|14.1
|1
|0.0
|0
|21.6
|1
|7
|-
|align="left"|Bannside
|bgcolor="#D46A4C"|33.7
|bgcolor="#D46A4C"|2
|19.6
|1
|27.7
|2
|5.8
|0
|13.2
|1
|0.0
|0
|0.0
|0
|0.0
|0
|6
|-
|align="left"|Braid
|bgcolor="#D46A4C"|46.0
|bgcolor="#D46A4C"|4
|17.2
|1
|17.1
|1
|3.4
|0
|8.2
|1
|5.9
|0
|0.0
|0
|2.2
|0
|7
|-
|align="left"|Carrick Castle
|bgcolor="#D46A4C"|27.2
|bgcolor="#D46A4C"|2
|16.1
|1
|5.8
|0
|14.5
|0
|0.0
|0
|0.0
|0
|12.9
|1
|23.5
|1
|5
|-
|align="left"|Coast Road
|bgcolor="#D46A4C"|21.2
|bgcolor="#D46A4C"|1
|17.5
|1
|10.7
|1
|10.9
|1
|14.0
|1
|7.7
|0
|0.0
|0
|18.0
|0
|5
|-
|align="left"|Knockagh
|bgcolor="#D46A4C"|35.7
|bgcolor="#D46A4C"|2
|26.6
|2
|9.9
|0
|15.9
|1
|0.0
|0
|0.0
|0
|0.0
|0
|11.9
|0
|5
|-
|align="left"|Larne Lough
|30.4
|2
|bgcolor="40BFF5"|31.0
|bgcolor="40BFF5"|2
|10.7
|0
|15.6
|1
|2.3
|0
|0.0
|0
|0.0
|0
|10.0
|0
|5
|- class="unsortable" class="sortbottom" style="background:#C9C9C9"
|align="left"| Total
|33.0
|16
|18.8
|9
|15.0
|5
|9.4
|3
|6.8
|3
|4.1
|1
|1.6
|2
|11.3
|2
|40
|-
|}

District results

Ballymena

2014: 3 x DUP, 1 x TUV, 1 x SDLP, 1 x UUP, 1 x Independent

Bannside

2014: 2 x DUP, 2 x TUV, 1 x UUP, 1 x Sinn Féin

Braid

2014: 4 x DUP, 1 x UUP, 1 x TUV, 1 x Sinn Féin

Carrick Castle

2014: 2 x DUP, 1 x UUP, 1 x UKIP, 1 x Independent

Coast Road

2014: 1 x DUP, 1 x UUP, 1 x Sinn Féin, 1 x Alliance, 1 x TUV

Knockagh

Larne Lough

* Incumbent

Changes during the term

† Co-options

♭ Carrick Castle by-election, 18 October 2018 
After independent unionist councillor Charles (Jim) Brown died in August 2018, the Electoral Office determined that none of his three proposed substitutes met the criteria for co-option. This triggered the first by-election in Northern Ireland since local government reform in 2014. The DUP's Peter Johnston won the seat on the third count.

‡ Changes in affiliation 

Last updated 31 March 2019.

Current composition: see Mid and East Antrim Borough Council.

References

2014 Northern Ireland local elections
21st century in County Antrim
Elections in County Antrim